Crocinosoma is a genus of bristle flies in the family Tachinidae. There is at least one described species in Crocinosoma, C. cornuale.

References

Further reading

External links

 

Tachininae